The Philippine House Committee on Rural Development, or House Rural Development Committee is a standing committee of the Philippine House of Representatives.

Jurisdiction 
As prescribed by House Rules, the committee's jurisdiction is on the development of rural areas and islands through policies, programs, support services and other interventions which includes the following:
 Access to rural projects funding and financing
 Area development planning
 Community mobilization and development
 Livelihood and enterprise development
 Microfinancing

Members, 18th Congress

See also 
 House of Representatives of the Philippines
 List of Philippine House of Representatives committees

References

External links 
House of Representatives of the Philippines

Rural Development